William Arthur Downe  (born 1952) is a Canadian banker who was chief executive officer of Bank of Montreal (also known as BMO Financial Group) from March 1, 2007, to October 31, 2017.

Career 
Downe joined Bank of Montreal in 1983 and held a variety of senior management positions in Canada and the U.S. In 1999, he was appointed vice-chair, Bank of Montreal. From 2001 to 2006, he was deputy chair of BMO Financial Group, and CEO of BMO Capital Markets.

In February 2006, Downe was named chief operating officer and was chosen to replace Tony Comper as president and chief executive officer of BMO effective March 1, 2007, the day of BMO's annual general meeting.

In December 2016, Downe was named a Member of the Order of Canada.

In April 2017, it was announced that Downe would retire as CEO effective on October 31, 2017. He was to be succeeded by current COO Darryl White, who had previously served as Group Head of BMO Capital Markets.

Professional associations
Downe is the only Canadian member of the International Business Leaders Advisory Council of the Mayor of Beijing, and he is a member of the International Advisory Council of Guanghua School of Management at Peking University. He is a director of Catalyst, and a member of Catalyst's Canadian Board of Advisors. Downe is also a member of the Economic Club of Chicago and Past President of the Federal Reserve Board's Federal Advisory Council.

Charity work 
Downe served as Chairman of the 2009 Campaign Cabinet for United Way of Greater Toronto. He is a member of the Rotman School of Management Campaign Cabinet, and he sits on the board of Toronto's St. Michael's Hospital Foundation. He is also past Chair of the Board of Directors of St. Michael's Hospital.

Education 
Downe has a Bachelor of Arts degree from Wilfrid Laurier University. While obtaining a Master of Business Administration from the University of Toronto, he joined the Alpha Delta Phi fraternity. In 2003, he received the Rotman Distinguished Business Alumni Award from the Joseph L. Rotman School of Management.

References

External links
Biography of William Downe at BMO corporate site
Order of Canada citation

1952 births
Living people
Bank of Montreal presidents
Businesspeople from Ontario
University of Toronto alumni
Wilfrid Laurier University alumni
Directors of Bank of Montreal
Businesspeople from Montreal
Canadian chief executives
Chief operating officers
Members of the Order of Canada